Industry self-regulation is the process whereby members of an industry, trade or sector of the economy monitor their own adherence to legal, ethical, or safety standards, rather than have an outside, independent agency such as a third party entity or governmental regulator monitor and enforce those standards. Self-regulation may ease compliance and ownership of standards, but it can also give rise to conflicts of interest. If any organization, such as a corporation or government bureaucracy, is asked to eliminate unethical behavior within their own group, it may be in their interest in the short run to eliminate the appearance of unethical behavior, rather than the behavior itself, by keeping any ethical breaches hidden, instead of exposing and correcting them. An exception occurs when the ethical breach is already known by the public. In that case, it could be in the group's interest to end the ethical problem to which the public has knowledge, but keep remaining breaches hidden. Another exception would occur in industry sectors with varied membership, such as international brands together with small and medium size companies where the brand owners would have an interest to protect the joint sector reputation by issuing together self-regulation so as to avoid smaller companies with less resources causing damage out of ignorance. Similarly, the reliability of a professional group such as lawyers and journalists could make ethical rules work satisfactorily as a self-regulation if they were a pre-condition for adherence of new members.

Advantages and disadvantages
An organization can maintain control over the standards to which they are held by successfully self-regulating. If they can keep the public from becoming aware of their internal problems, this also serves in place of a public relations campaign to repair such damage. The cost of setting up an external enforcement mechanism is avoided. If the self-regulation can avoid reputational damage and related risks to all actors in the industry, this would be a powerful incentive for a pro-active self-regulation [without the necessity to assume it is to hide something].

Self-regulating attempts may well fail, due to the inherent conflict of interest in asking any organization to police itself. If the public becomes aware of this failure, an external, independent organization is often given the duty of policing them, sometimes with highly punitive measures taken against the organization. The results can be disastrous, such as a military with no external, independent oversight, which may commit human rights violations against the public. Not all businesses will voluntarily meet best practice standards, leaving some users exposed.

Governments may prefer to allow an industry to regulate itself but maintain a watching brief over the effectiveness of self-regulation and be willing to introduce external regulation if necessary. For example, in the UK, the House of Commons Public Accounts Committee in 2015 investigated the role of large accountancy firms in relation to tax avoidance and argued that "Government needs to take a more active role in regulating the tax industry, as it evidently cannot be trusted to regulate itself".

Organizations

When directly self-regulating, the organization directly monitors and punishes its own members. For example, many small organizations have the ability to remove any member by a vote of all members. Another common form is where the organization establishes an external policing organization. This organization is established, and controlled by, the parent organization, so cannot be considered independent, however. In another form, the organization sets up a committee or division for policing the remainder of the organization. The House Ethics Committee is an example in the United States government, while various police departments employ an Internal Affairs division to perform a similar function.

 American Bar Association (ABA) formulates model ethical codes related to the legal profession. The ABA has 410,000 members.
 Every state bar association in the U.S. is a self-policing organization.
 The American Advertising Federation (AAF), the American Association of Advertising Agencies (AAAA), the Association of National Advertisers (ANA), and the Interactive Advertising Bureau (IAB) together work with the National Advertising Division (NAD) to establish and enforce guidance related to truth in advertising for national advertising.
 The Direct Selling Association (DSA) works with the third-party Direct Selling Self-Regulatory Council (DSSRC) to establish and enforce guidance related to the direct-selling industry.
 Canadian Disc Jockey Association
 BBB National Programs oversees more than a dozen national industry self-regulation programs that provide third-party accountability and dispute resolution services to companies, outside and in-house counsel, consumers, and others in arenas such as privacy, advertising, data collection, child-directed marketing, and more.

Within organizations
Self-regulation is the process whereby an organization is asked, or volunteers, to monitor its own adherence to legal, ethical, or safety standards, rather than have an outside, independent agency such as a governmental entity monitor and enforce those standards. Self-regulation can have an effect on specifying existing guidelines or laws in certain contexts, foremost in the context of specific technical fields such as environmental protection, biotechnology, but also for the field of business and trade. 
Self-regulatory measures such as codes of conduct can have important indirect legal relevance based on their effect of creating legal certainty and a waiver of liability in civil law, labor law and even criminal law.

See also
 Conflict of interest
 Ethical code
 Marking your own homework
 Self-regulatory organization

Notes

External links
 US Environmental Protection Agency's Audit Policy
 NASA/FAA Aviation Safety Reporting System

Conflict of interest
Organizational behavior
Self-regulation